Elisabeta Băbeanu (born 10 April 1962) is a Romanian sprint canoer who competed in the early 1980s. At the 1980 Summer Olympics in Moscow, she finished fourth in the K-2 500 m event.

References
Sports-Reference.com profile

External links

1962 births
Canoeists at the 1980 Summer Olympics
Living people
Olympic canoeists of Romania
Romanian female canoeists
Place of birth missing (living people)